Mist King Urth is the second collaboration album between American indie rock musicians Robert Pollard and Doug Gillard under the name Lifeguards released in 2003.

Track listing
All songs written by Robert Pollard and Doug Gillard, except where noted.

Gift Of The Mountain (Doug Gillard)
Starts At The River
First Of An Early Go-Getter
Society Dome
Shorter Virgins
No Chain Breaking
Sea Of Dead (Instrumental) (Doug Gillard)
Surgeon Is Complete
Then We Agree
Fether Herd (Doug Gillard)
Red Whips And Miracles

Personnel

Musicians 
Robert Pollard – lead vocals
Doug Gillard – guitar, backing vocals, drums, bass guitar

Technical 

 Jeff Graham – mastering
 Robert Pollard – cover artwork

References

2003 albums